Esteghlal F.C. is an Iranian professional association football club base in Tehran. The club was formed in Ferdowsi Street, central Tehran on 26 September 1945 as Docharkhesavaran and was renamed to Taj F.C. on 11 February 1950. In spring of 1979 and only a few weeks after the Iranian revolution the club was renamed to its current name, Esteghlal F.C.

Chairmen 

Key

  Chairmen with this background in the "Chairman" column are italicised to denote acting chairmen.

See also 

 List of Esteghlal F.C. records and statistics
 List of Esteghlal F.C. honours

Footnotes

References

Sources 

 Esteghlal seasons stats Page
 Iran Premier League Stats
 RSSSF database about Iranian league football.
 Persian League

Bibliography 

 

Esteghlal F.C.